Manor is a borough in Westmoreland County, Pennsylvania, United States. The population was 3,239 at the 2010 census. Manor metamorphosed from the original railroad stop, Manor Station, into the borough it is today.

Geography
Manor is located at  (40.335854, -79.668229).

Surrounding neighborhoods
Manor has three borders, including the townships of Penn from the northwest to the east, Hempfield to the southeast and North Huntingdon from the south to the west.

Demographics

As of the census of 2000, there were 2,796 people, 1,001 households, and 784 families living in the borough. The population density was 1,390.7 people per square mile (537.1/km2). There were 1,044 housing units at an average density of 519.3 per square mile (200.5/km2). The racial makeup of the borough was 99.39% White, 0.11% African American, 0.07% Native American, 0.21% Asian, 0.07% from other races, and 0.14% from two or more races. Hispanic or Latino of any race were 0.86% of the population.

There were 1,001 households, out of which 42.1% had children under the age of 18 living with them, 67.5% were married couples living together, 8.1% had a female householder with no husband present, and 21.6% were non-families. 20.1% of all households were made up of individuals, and 8.9% had someone living alone who was 65 years of age or older. The average household size was 2.73 and the average family size was 3.15.

In the borough the population was spread out, with 28.7% under the age of 18, 5.9% from 18 to 24, 32.2% from 25 to 44, 20.1% from 45 to 64, and 13.2% who were 65 years of age or older. The median age was 37 years. For every 100 females, there were 96.1 males. For every 100 females age 18 and over, there were 90.1 males.

The median income for a household in the borough was $41,266, and the median income for a family was $47,440. Males had a median income of $38,281 versus $26,250 for females. The per capita income for the borough was $18,118. About 4.5% of families and 5.4% of the population were below the poverty line, including 4.7% of those under age 18 and 8.1% of those age 65 or over.

References

Boroughs in Westmoreland County, Pennsylvania
Populated places established in 1873
Pittsburgh metropolitan area
1873 establishments in Pennsylvania